Domitian was a Roman emperor of the Flavian dynasty who reigned 81–96.

Domitian may also refer to:
 Domitian II (died 271), Roman usurper for a few weeks
 Domitius Domitianus (died 297), rarely known as Domitian III, Roman usurper who ruled Egypt in 297
 Domitian of Huy (died 560), Gaulish bishop and saint
 Domitian of Melitene (c. 550–602), Archbishop of Melitene, saint and nephew of Eastern Roman Emperor Maurice
 Domitian of Carantania (died c. 802), Slavic nobleman, Catholic saint and legendary cofounder of the Millstatt Abbey

See also
 Domitius (disambiguation)

Ancient Roman praenomina